Khaled Juffali (born 1 January 1958), is a Saudi businessman.

Early life and education
Juffali was born in Jeddah on 1 January 1958. He is the second son of the founder of E. A. Juffali and Brothers, Ahmed Juffali His mother is Suad bint Ibrahim Al Husseini the grand daughter of Kamil of Jerusalem and niece of Amin al-Husseini.  Khaled had two full-brothers: Walid Juffali, and Tarek Ahmed Al Juffali.

Juffali was educated in Lebanon and Switzerland, before earning a degree in business administration from the University of San Diego. He was given an honorary doctorate in business administration from Menlo College in 2009.

Career
Juffali is a managing partner and vice chairman at E. A. Juffali and Brothers. He is also the chairman of the Khaled Juffali Company (KJC), a privately held investment company, and of the Saudi German Business Council. He sits on the board of directors of the Saudi Arabian Monetary Authority, and the boards of numerous investment companies.

Juffali is chairman of ReAya Holding, Saudi Tractors Manufacturing, National Automobile Industry, Saudi Ericsson Communications, Fluor Daniel Arabia, and Raychem Saudi Arabia.

Personal life
He is married to fellow Saudi, Olfat Al-Mutlaq Juffali, and they have four children together. In September 2018, he purchased Cypriot citizenship through a Cyprus government citizenship-by-investment programme.

References

21st-century Saudi Arabian businesspeople
1958 births
Living people
Alumni of Institut Le Rosey
Khaled
People from Jeddah
University of San Diego alumni